Hung Ling-fook (born 1 November 1951), better known as Susan Tse Suet-sum, is a Hong Kong television actress, who started her career in Chinese opera. She is the 76th generation descendant of Confucius.  This was confirmed by China's family tree study of Confucius according to her appearance on the TVB show Be My Guest.

Career
Tse participated in the Cross-Harbour Swimming contest at the age of 3. She then became the disciple of Cantonese opera legends Yam and Bak at the age of 11. She later joined ATV in 1996 and then TVB in 2008.

Filmography

Television

References

External links

 

 
|-
! colspan="3" style="background: #DAA520;" | TVB Anniversary Awards
|-

1951 births
TVB actors
Hong Kong Buddhists
Hong Kong film actresses
Hong Kong television actresses
Living people
21st-century Hong Kong actresses
Hong Kong female swimmers
Hong Kong people of Shun Tak descent